The Roots of Evil: A Social History of Crime and Punishment is a book written by Christopher Hibbert in 1963 which traces the development of the social justice system, mostly from an English perspective, though information about the continent and the United States is also included.

Overview

With this conclusion, Hibbert traces the development and decline of cruel punishments, the guillotine in France and the modern prison in England, which still used hanging when the book was first published. The chapter Causes and Cures contains the salient point that "There seems, indeed, no surer way of keeping a boy [or girl] from a life of crime than providing him with a happy and worthwhile childhood in a family which loves him and which he loves", and suggests that while "a crime is only a crime when a law ... makes it so", pointing out that by the nineteenth century nine of the ten laws which Hebraic law punished with stoning "had ceased to be offences in civilized European societies". Although "Drink and drugs and speed and sex are exciting, and so is crime and in cities the opportunity for crime are extensive and the rewards are high, the chances of escape are greater and most of the police are overworked and some of them may be corruptible." While it is suggested that to change crime requires changing society, the last sentence of the chapter is "No completely satisfactory answers have yet been found."

The last chapter, Progress and Palindrome, points out that "the solution lies not in making punishments more severe, but in making them more certain and in relating them to each individual criminal, so that if he is reformable he may be reformed." Also, "there are germs of evil in the best of us and seeds of good in the worst", and there are no quick and inexpensive solutions to the problem of crime, which requires changing the soil, more than changing the seeds.

Contents
Part I: The Growth of Punishment 602 - 1750
 The Age of Chivalry
 The Age of Learning
 The Age of Elegance
Part II: The Beginnings of Reform 1750 - 1945
 The Law Reformers
 The Police Reformers
 The Prison Reformers
Part III: Criminal Man
 L'Uomo Delinquente
 Causes and Cures
 The Criminal's Psychology
Part IV: The Crime Cult
Part V: The Detection of Crime
Part VI: The Great Melting Pot
 The New World
 Gangs and Syndicates
 Cops and G-Men
Part VII: Present Problems
 Capital Punishment
 Corporal Punishment
 Prisons
 Police
 The Young Offender
 The Sexual Offender
Part VIII: Progress and Palindrome

References

The Roots of Evil 1963 524 pages Little Brown and Company LOC 63-8961
The Roots of Evil 2003 Paperback 

1963 non-fiction books
Criminology
Books by Christopher Hibbert